Steib Metallbau, later trading as Josef Steib Spezialfabrik für Seitenwagen, were a company from Nuremberg in Germany who manufactured sidecars. The firm was founded in 1914 by Josef Steib Senior and began making sidecars in 1928 following a commission from the motorcycle manufacturer Ardie. The company closed in 1957.

The company reached its peak in the 1950s when it claimed to manufacture 92% of all sidecars sold in Germany and the sidecars were the standard model offered with BMW motorcycles.

Replica outfits remain in production today.

References

External links

 Nürnberg history website with outline of the Steib company 
 Website with illustrations from 1930's Steib catalogues
 Website with information from Steib's 1951-52 catalogue about basic models

Motorcycle manufacturers of Germany